Donghae may refer to:

 East Sea, the South Korean name of the Sea of Japan
 Donghae Expressway, the name of the expressway in South Korea
 Donghae Line, a railway line in Busan, South Korea
 Donghae City, in South Korea
 Donghae-class corvette, a class of four ships of navy of South Korea
 Lee Donghae (born 1986), member of K-pop boy band, Super Junior

See also 
 東海 (disambiguation), the East Asian script for "East Sea"
 Donghai (disambiguation), Pinyin romanization
 Tōkai (disambiguation), Japanese romanization 
 Tunghai (disambiguation), Wade–Giles romanization